Radošovce may refer to several places in Slovakia notably in the Trnava Region.

Radošovce, Skalica District
Radošovce, Trnava District